Mower is a hardcore/punk jazz band from San Diego, California, formed in the early 1990s. The band released their debut album, Mower, in 2003 on Suburban Noize Records. The band's alter ego 'Slower' is a softer version of the band with more of a softer jazz/lounge punk sound.

Biography
Mower is a punk band from California, with two vocalists, Brian Sheerin and Dominic Moscatello. The band is signed to Suburban Noize Records and released three albums on the record label: Mower (2003), Not for You (2006), and Make It a Double (2009). Slower is a softer "alter ego" of Mower and releases songs on Mower's albums. Slower has all of the same band members but perform a softer, jazzier version of Mower. In 1999, Mower went on the Vans Warped Tour.

Discography
 Mower (2003)
 Not for You (2006)
 Make It a Double (2009)

Members
 Brian Sheerin (vocals)
 Dominic Moscatello (vocals)
 Chris McCredie (bass)
 Brian "Stone" Pennington (guitar)
 Jessie Tato (drums)

External links 
 Suburban Noize
 Reverbnation
 Myspace
 Subnoize Store
 Last.fm

Hardcore punk groups from California
Suburban Noize Records artists
Musical groups from San Diego